Faizabad Cantonment, officially known as Ayodhya Cantonment is a cantonment town in Faizabad in the Indian state of Uttar Pradesh, close to the city of Faizabad. Established in the year 1858, today the Faizabad Cantonment is a Class I,2,3,4,5 cantonment.

Demographics
 India census, Faizabad Cantonment had a population of 78901. Males constitute 52% of the population and females 48%. Faizabad Cantonment has an average literacy rate of 82%, higher than the national average of 59.5%: male literacy is 86%, and female literacy is 78%. In Faizabad Cantonment, 8% of the population is under 6 years of age.

References

External links
 Cantonment Board, website

Cities and towns in Faizabad district
Faizabad
Cantonment towns in Uttar Pradesh
Cantonments of British India
Cantonments of India
Populated places established in 1878